The Shoemaker and the Peddler is a 1960 musical based on the story of Sacco and Vanzetti written by Armand Aulicino with music by Frank Fields.

Bibliography 

 
 
 
 
 
 
 

1960 plays
American musicals
Works about Sacco and Vanzetti